Star Wars Republic Commando: Order 66 is the fourth novel in the Republic Commando series, written by Karen Traviss. It is a sequel to Hard Contact, Triple Zero, and True Colors; it continues the story of Omega Squad's actions during the Clone Wars. It was released on 16 September 2008.

Characters
Republic Commandos:
Omega Squad:
 RC-1136 / Darman
 RC-1309 / Niner
 RC-3222 / Atin
 RC-8015 / Fi (formerly)
 Corr

Jedi:
 Valaqil (male Gurlanin)
 General Arligan Zey (male human) (Jedi Master)
 General Etain Tur-Mukan (deceased) (female human) (Jedi Knight)
 Obi-Wan Kenobi (mentioned only) (male human) (Jedi Master)
 Yoda (mentioned only) (male unknown) (Jedi Grand Master)
 Mace Windu (mentioned only) (deceased) (male human) (Jedi Master)

Mandalorian:
 Bardan Jusik (male human) (former Jedi Knight, now Mandalorian)
 Sergeant Kal Skirata (male human) (Mandalorian mercenary)
 Walon Vau (male human) (Mandalorian mercenary)

Delta Squad:
 RC-1138 / Boss
 RC-1207 / Sev (M.I.A.)
 RC-1262 / Scorch
 RC-1140 / Fixer

ARC Troopers:
 Null ARC Trooper N-11 / Ordo
 Null ARC Trooper N-7 / Mereel
 Null ARC Trooper N-10 / Jaing
 Null ARC Trooper N-6 / Kom'rk
 Null ARC Trooper N-5 / Prudii
 Null ARC Trooper N-12 / A'den
 ARC Trooper A-30 / Sull
 ARC Trooper A-02 / Spar
 ARC Trooper A-26 / Captain Maze

Others:
 Dr. Ovolot Qail Uthan (female human) (former Separatist genetics expert)
 Enacca (female Wookiee)
 Lord Mirdalan (Walon Vau's pet strill)
 Laseema (female Twi'lek) (Waitress)
 Agent Besany Wennen (female human) (Republic Treasury Investigator)
 Fenn Shysa
 Captain Jaller Obrim (male human) (Coruscant Security Force)
 Reye Nenilin
 Rav Bralor
 Parja Bralor
 Palpatine / Darth Sidious (male human) (Chancellor of the Republic, Sith Lord)
 Kal Skirata (male human)
 Tarfful (mentioned only) (male Wookiee)
 Commander Cody (mentioned only) (Jango Fett clone)
 Jango Fett (mentioned only) (deceased) (male human)
 Boba Fett (mentioned only) (Jango Fett's son)
 Ghez Hokan (mentioned only) (deceased) (male human)
 Munin Skirata (male human)
 Jun Hokan (male human)
 Ijaat Skirata (male human)
 Tor Skirata (mentioned only) (male human)
 Ruusaan Skirata (female human)
 Arla Fett (female human)
 General Grievous (mentioned only) (male Khaleesh) (deceased)
 K'Kruhk
 Ko Sai (mentioned only) (female Kaminoan) (deceased)
 Jolluc (deceased) (male human)
 Jinart (mentioned only) (female Gurlanin)

Planets
 Coruscant
 Mandalore
 Harugab
 Kashyyyk

Species
 Human
 Wookiee
 Twi'lek
 Trandoshan
 Geonosian
 Kaminoan (mentioned only)
 Gurlanin

Plot
Etain Tur-Mukan finally tells Darman that her son, Kad Skirata, who is under the guise of Kal Skirata's grandchild from one of his biological children, is also Darman's son. Though Darman is angered by this initially for Etain and Skirata keeping this from him, he finally starts to spend time with Etain and Kad during their "quiet" moments when he and Etain are not out in battle in the Clone Wars.

Skirata becomes a wanted man in the Old Republic because of him falsely stating that he killed Kaminoan geneticist Ko Sai, who played a major role in creating the Jango Fett clones, and then stole her data. And during that time, Skirata manages to bust Ovolot Qail Uthan, Separatist scientist imprisoned three years earlier by Omega Squad for trying to create a Fett clone virus, from prison because Skirata believes that despite her actions, he sees her as the ultimate key to giving the Fett clones a normal life span, since their life spans are lengthened by double the time (e.g., if they are chronologically two years old, then they're biologically four years old, etc.). Along with busting Uthan from prison is Arla Fett, Jango Fett's long lost insane sister, and Ruusaan Skirata, Kal's biological daughter. Meanwhile, Besany Wennen, Republic Treasury agent who is now married to one of Skirata's clones, Ordo, is almost caught by the authorities for sneaking into data files to find out the Republic's plan for the clones in the near future of the war. However, the Gurlanins, who have reclaimed their home planet of Qiilura from the colonist humans under the machinations of Etain, decide to repay the debt by framing Besany's friend, Jilka Zan Zentis, for the crime. However, under Skirata's hand, Jilka is set free from the authorities, a wanted fugitive now, and under Skirata's band.

But just when Skirata's plans for bringing a positive future for his clone adopted sons seem to come into fruition, Chancellor Palpatine enacts Order 66, which means that all clones must kill off their Jedi commanders. Etain managed to have renounced her Jedi ways prior to Order 66's enactment and married Darman in a traditional Mandalorian way over a comm message. But Etain is trapped on a bridge on Coruscant with many other citizens of the Republic by clone troopers who are scanning for any Jedi to be killed in the crowd. Skirata, Darman and Skirata's other clones arrive to extract Etain, but Jedi are found among the crowd. And during the ensuing battle, Etain protects a clone from being killed by a Jedi wielding a lightsaber, and she is killed from the wound. Darman's fellow clone brother, Niner, is wounded from the battle when his spine is broken, and clones extract Niner to heal him up, with Darman following along to stay with his wounded brother, now that he is grieving for his lost wife.

Skirata and all the others leave Coruscant and head for the Mandalorian home planet of Mandalore just as the Clone Wars come to an end, along with the Jedi Order thanks to Order 66 and of the Republic, being replaced by Palpatine's self-promotion to Emperor of the new Galactic Empire. As for Darman and Niner, they are now Imperial Commandos.

References

Republic Commando
2008 British novels
2008 science fiction novels
Republic Commando: True Colors
English novels
Del Rey books